Aponoeme amazonica is a species of beetle in the family Cerambycidae. It was described by U. R. Martins in 1985. It is known from the state of Amazonas, Brazil.

References

Oemini
Beetles of South America
Insects of Brazil
Endemic fauna of Brazil
Beetles described in 1985